Salamatof (Dena'ina: Ken Dech’etl’t) is a census-designated place (CDP) in Kenai Peninsula Borough, Alaska, United States. The population was 1,078 at the 2020 census, up from 980 in 2010. Salamatof is the location for the former Wildwood Air Force Station, which operated from 1965 to 1972 (from 1951 to 1965, it was an Army Station). Today, it is the Wildwood Correctional Complex.

Geography
Salamatof is located on the western side of the Kenai Peninsula at  (60.593250, -151.310547), and comprises populated areas between the city of Kenai to the south and unincorporated Nikiski to the north. It is bordered to the west by Cook Inlet.

Demographics

Salamatof first appeared on the 1980 U.S. Census as a census-designated place (CDP).

Its predecessor was Wildwood Air Force Station, which appeared on the 1970 census, and was located on the southeast side of the CDP. It had 750 residents stationed there before its closure in 1972.

As of the census of 2000, there were 954 people, 220 households, and 163 families residing in the CDP. There were 282 housing units at an average density of 34.8/sq mi (13.4/km2). The racial makeup of the CDP was 71.80% White, 3.35% Black or African American, 19.92% Native American, 0.52% Asian, 0.10% Pacific Islander, 0.94% from other races, and 3.35% from two or more races.  3.35% of the population were Hispanic or Latino of any race.

There were 220 households, out of which 35.5% had children under the age of 18 living with them, 60.9% were married couples living together, 8.2% had a female householder with no husband present, and 25.9% were non-families. 20.5% of all households were made up of individuals, and 3.6% had someone living alone who was 65 years of age or older.  The average household size was 2.65 and the average family size was 3.04.

In the CDP, the population was spread out, with 17.3% under the age of 18, 10.9% from 18 to 24, 39.2% from 25 to 44, 25.1% from 45 to 64, and 7.5% who were 65 years of age or older.  The median age was 37 years. For every 100 females, there were 214.9 males.  For every 100 females age 18 and over, there were 253.8 males.

The median income for a household in the CDP was $44,861, and the median income for a family was $46,719. Males had a median income of $40,250 versus $31,250 for females. The per capita income for the CDP was $16,306.  About 11.9% of families and 11.9% of the population were below the poverty line, including 14.4% of those under age 18 and 7.7% of those age 65 or over.

References

Census-designated places in Alaska
Census-designated places in Kenai Peninsula Borough, Alaska
Populated coastal places in Alaska on the Pacific Ocean